The 2006–07 NOJHL season is the 29th season of the Northern Ontario Junior Hockey League (NOJHL). The seven teams of the NOJHL will play 48-game schedules.

Come February, the top teams of each division will play down for the Copeland-McNamara Trophy, the NOJHL championship.  The winner of the Copeland-McNamara Trophy will compete in the Central Canadian Junior "A" championship, the Dudley Hewitt Cup.  If successful against the winners of the Ontario Junior Hockey League and Superior International Junior Hockey League, the champion would then move on to play in the Canadian Junior Hockey League championship, the 2007 Royal Bank Cup.

Changes 
Northern Michigan Black Bears become the Soo Indians.

Final standings
Note: GP = Games played; W = Wins; L = Losses; OTL = Overtime losses; SL = Shootout losses; GF = Goals for; GA = Goals against; PTS = Points; x = clinched playoff berth; y = clinched division title; z = clinched conference title

Teams listed on the official league website.

Standings listed on official league website.

2006-07 Copeland-McNamara Trophy Playoffs

Playoff results are listed on the official league website.

Dudley Hewitt Cup Championship
Hosted by the Abitibi Eskimos in Iroquois Falls, Ontario.  Abitibi finished third and Soo finished fourth.

Round Robin
Aurora Tigers (OPJHL) 4 - Soo Indians 1
Schreiber Diesels (SIJHL) 5 - Abitibi Eskimos 4
Abitibi Eskimos 4 - Soo Indians 2
Soo Indians 2 - Schreiber Diesels (SIJHL) 1
Aurora Tigers (OPJHL) 7 - Abitibi Eskimos 0

Semi-final
Schreiber Diesels (SIJHL) 6 - Abitibi Eskimos 5

Scoring leaders 
Note: GP = Games played; G = Goals; A = Assists; Pts = Points; PIM = Penalty minutes

Leading goaltenders 
Note: GP = Games played; Mins = Minutes played; W = Wins; L = Losses: OTL = Overtime losses; SL = Shootout losses; GA = Goals Allowed; SO = Shutouts; GAA = Goals against average

Awards
Player of the Year - Anthony Libonati (Blind River Beavers)
Most Valuable Player - Dan Dube (Abitibi Eskimos)
Most Gentlemanly Player - Matt Brunet (Abitibi Eskimos)
Rookie of the Year - Brett Perlini (Soo Thunderbirds)
Top Defenceman - Mitch Champagne (Abitibi Eskimos)
Most Improved Player - Dylan King (Soo Thunderbirds)
Top Defensive Forward - Jeremy Hilliard (Blind River Beavers)
Top "Team Player" - Anthony Libonati (Blind River Beavers)
Director of the Year - Scott Marshall (Abitibi Eskimos)
Coach of the Year - Todd Stencill (Blind River Beavers)
Team Goaltending Award - Brennan Poderzay, Elliot Hogue (Soo Indians)
Top Goals Against Average - Brennan Poderzay (Soo Indians)
Scoring Champion - Scott Restoule (Sudbury Jr. Wolves)
Playoff Most Valuable Player - Brendan Biedermann (Sudbury Jr. Wolves)
Scholastic Player of the Year - Brad Hummel (North Bay Skyhawks)

See also 
 2007 Royal Bank Cup
 Dudley Hewitt Cup
 List of NOHA Junior A seasons
 Ontario Junior Hockey League
 Superior International Junior Hockey League
 Greater Ontario Junior Hockey League

References

External links 
 Official website of the Northern Ontario Junior Hockey League
 Official website of the Canadian Junior Hockey League

NOJHL
Northern Ontario Junior Hockey League seasons